{{DISPLAYTITLE:C22H26N2O2}}
The molecular formula C22H26N2O2 (molar mass: 350.45 g/mol) may refer to:

 Oil Blue 35, a blue anthraquinone dye
 Vinpocetine, a synthetic derivative of the vinca alkaloid vincamine

Molecular formulas